The R565 road is a regional road in Ireland. It is a road on the Iveragh Peninsula and Valentia Island in County Kerry. The road is part of the Wild Atlantic Way.

The R565 travels west from the N70 to Portmagee. At Portmagee, the road crosses the Maurice O'Neill Memorial Bridge to Valentia Island, the island's only road access. Travelling east across the island via Chapeltown, the road terminates at the port village of Knightstown, where a ferry runs to the mainland.

References

Regional roads in the Republic of Ireland
Roads in County Kerry